Edmund Chow Wai-hung (born 1 May 1925) is a Hong Kong lawyer, businessman and politician. 

Chow was born in 1925 and was educated at the King's College, Hong Kong. He later studied abroad in England and received a law degree. He established Edmund W.H. Chow & Co.. He was the honorary legal adviser for various public organisations and chambers. He also held many positions of various companies, including chairman of the Great Credit Finance Limited, Chow Chow Land and Trading Limited, Hinwong Land Investment Company Limited and Civic Travels Limited. He co-founded the Hong Kong Civic Association in 1954 and became its vice-chairman. He was an elected member of the Urban Council from 1973 to 1986.

References

1925 births
Possibly living people
Members of the Urban Council of Hong Kong
Hong Kong Civic Association politicians
Hong Kong businesspeople
Solicitors of Hong Kong